Athyrium arisanense is a fern within the Athyriaceae family, endemic to Taiwan. Its common Chinese name and its species name refer to the Alishan Range.

References

External links 

 

Endemic flora of Taiwan
arisanense